Frank Mortimer (23 February 1932 – 4 March 2009) was an English professional rugby league footballer who played in the 1950s and 1960s.

Background
Frank Mortimer was born in Streethouse, Wakefield, West Riding of Yorkshire, his birth was registered during second ¼ in Pontefract district, West Riding of Yorkshire, England, he worked as a colliery surveyor, he was the treasurer of Streethouse Cricket Club, he died aged 77 of cancer in St James's University Hospital, Leeds, West Yorkshire, his funeral service took place at The Church of St Luke the Evangelist, 6 Cow Lane, Sharlston at 10.30am on Monday 16 March 2009, his committal took place at Pontefract Crematorium, Wakefield Road, Pontefract at 11.00am, followed by a reception at Streethouse Cricket Club. The 'Frank Mortimer Award' is presented annually to those making an outstanding contribution to Streethouse Cricket Club.

Playing career

International honours
Frank Mortimer played , and scored three conversions in Great Britain's 21–10 victory over Australia in the first 1956 Ashes Test Match at Central Park, Wigan on Saturday 17 November 1956, and scored three goals in Great Britain's 9–22 defeat by Australia in the second 1956 Ashes Test Match at Odsal Stadium, Bradford on Saturday 1 December 1956.

County honours
Frank Mortimer was selected for Yorkshire County XIII whilst at Wakefield Trinity during the 1955–56 season and 1956–57 season.

County League appearances
Frank Mortimer played in Wakefield Trinity's victory Yorkshire County League during the 1958–59 season.

County Cup Final appearances
Frank Mortimer played , and scored 4-goals in Wakefield Trinity's 23–5 victory over Hunslet in the 1956 Yorkshire County Cup Final during the 1956–57 season at Headingley Rugby Stadium, Leeds on Saturday 20 October 1956, and played , and scored 2-goals in the 20–24 defeat by Leeds in the 1958 Yorkshire County Cup Final during the 1958–59 season at Odsal Stadium, Bradford on Saturday 18 October 1958.

Club career
Frank Mortimer was signed by Wakefield Trinity in May 1948, and he made his début playing right-, i.e. number 3, in the 18–17 victory over Leeds in the Yorkshire County Cup semi-final during the 1951–52 season at Headingley Rugby Stadium, Leeds on Monday 8 October 1951, in front of crowd of 22,300, he played his last match for Wakefield Trinity during the 1958–59 season, he is 4th on Wakefield Trinity's all-time goal kicking table, and 5th on Wakefield Trinity's all-time points scoring table, he appears to have scored no drop-goals (or field-goals as they are currently known in Australasia), but prior to the 1974–75 season all goals, whether; conversions, penalties, or drop-goals, scored 2-points, consequently prior to this date drop-goals were often not explicitly documented, therefore '0' drop-goals may indicate drop-goals not recorded, rather than no drop-goals scored.

Genealogical information
Frank Mortimer's marriage to Colleen (née Hobson) was registered during fourth ¼ 1956 in Wakefield district. They had children; Andrew J. Mortimer (birth registered during fourth ¼  in Wakefield district), Amanda "Mandy" J. Mortimer (birth registered during third ¼  in Lower Agbrigg district), and Michael Jason Mortimer (birth registered during second ¼  in Hemsworth district).

References

External links
!Great Britain Statistics at englandrl.co.uk (statistics currently missing due to not having appeared for both Great Britain, and England)
Ashes Series 1956 at rugbyleagueproject.org
 (archived by web.archive.org) Wildcats remember Frank Mortimer* (archived by archive.is)
 (archived by web.archive.org) Wildcats remember Frank Mortimer* (archived by archive.is)
Boys are back in town
Tributes pour in for a true Trinity great
Obituary in Wakefield Express at announcements.johnstonpress.co.uk
Obituary in Wakefield Express at announcements.johnstonpress.co.uk

1932 births
2009 deaths
English rugby league players
Great Britain national rugby league team players
Keighley Cougars players
Rugby league players from Wakefield
Rugby league centres
Rugby league fullbacks
Wakefield Trinity players
Yorkshire rugby league team players